The Battle of Zurich may refer to:
 The siege of Zurich during the Old Zürich War (1443–1446)
 Either of two battles during the war between revolutionary France and the Second Coalition (1798–1800):
 First Battle of Zurich, (June 1799)
 Second Battle of Zurich, (September 1799)
 The Züriputsch (6 September 1839)